Jessica Linley (born 28 March 1989) was crowned Miss England on 1 September 2010.  She is originally from Norwich. She represented Nottingham at the Miss England competition and England at Miss World 2010.

In 2016, she played the role as Big Len's girlfriend in Sky One's comedy Trollied.

Biography 

Linley was born at the Reading and Wokingham hospital on 28 March 1989, to Michael and Rosemary Linley. She moved from Reading to Norwich in 1991. Linley attended Brundall Primary School and Thorpe St Andrew High School. At sixth form in Norwich, she obtained 3 A-levels in History, English Literature and Religious Studies. At university, she was Treasurer of the Law Society and Finance Officer for the Athletic Union.

Media 
In November 2010, she spoke out against the rise in student tuition fees.

References

Living people
People from Nottingham
English beauty pageant winners
Miss World 2010 delegates
Miss England winners
Alumni of the University of Nottingham
1989 births